Pee Dee, North Carolina may refer to:

Pee Dee, Anson County, North Carolina
Pee Dee, Montgomery County, North Carolina